North Monterey County High School is a high school in Castroville, California, USA, was established in 1978. It serves the populations of Aromas, Castroville, Prunedale, Royal Oaks, Elkhorn and Salinas. NThe school is part of the North Monterey County Unified School District. North Monterey County High School is abbreviated on some official documents as NMCHS although it is more commonly known as either "North County" or "NC".

Students
The school serves just under 1,500 students. 56% are Hispanic or Latino, 36% are White, 2% are African American and 3% are Asian. About one-fifth of North County students are designated as English Language Learners.

Background
Before 1978, North Monterey County students traveled to Salinas for high school. Many local residents wanted to have their own high school so that their children would not have to travel. In 1978, voters approved a bond measure to build the high school under the campaign slogan "Yes is Best". In fall 1978, North County opened to a new student body that did not include a senior class. In June 1980, the first class graduated. In 1985, the high school won national recognition from President Reagan as one of the best 100 high schools in the cUS and subsequently won two distinguished California High School Awards in the 1990s. The school was recently recognized at the California Conference of Superintendents for its high Latino graduation rate.

Governance
The school's budget is determined by the Board of Trustees of the North Monterey County Unified School District. Internally, the administration of the school is led by three co-ordinators, Jim Oneil, Laurel Gast,and Richard Gutierrez. An activities director oversees school activities and an athletic director manages school athletics. Some funding for the school is controlled by the School Site Council or SIP (School Site Improvement Project). The SIP committee is co-ordinated by the SIP Co-ordinator who is a salaried school official. The current SIP co-ordinator is Laurel Gast. The committee members include parents, staff, the principal and students. The members elect their president.

Academics, courses, graduation requirements
North County offers a selection of courses to istudents. It has ROP, art, photography and technology courses. NC has an honors and AP program that includes several AP courses. The first AP courses offered at North County were AP US history and English. NC's API test scores place it as average in California, but its API scores in the context of similar schools ranks it as above average.

Activities

Marching band
The NMCHS marching band, directed by Maricella Chapa, has received attention for performances in China, Italy and Hawaii, and participation in President Clinton's second inaugural parade. Likewise, the wind ensemble, symphonic and jazz bands have performed at these localations as well as competitions in Canada, Colorado Springs and the Monterey Jazz Festival.

Sports
American football
Baseball
Softball
Soccer
Track and field 
Golf
Wrestling
Boys' basketball
Girls' basketball
Cross country 
Volleyball
Marching band

Non-sport activities
Cheerleading
Color Guard

Clubs and organizations
Coding Club
Link Crew
Slough Crew
Interact Club
J.S.A.
Dance Krew
My Life 
Midnighters Youth Club
Dance Company
AVID (Advancement Via Individual Determination)
Drama: Encore!
The Talon (school newspaper)
Rainbow Warriors
Yearbook
Math Club
ADAPT
Aguilas Guererras
MESA
Auto shop
Skills USA

The North County Talon is the school newspaper. The Wingspan is the parents' newsletter.

Notable alumni 
Jamie Iredell, writer

References

External links
North Monterey County High School
North Monterey County High School Cross Country & Track

High schools in Monterey County, California
Educational institutions established in 1978
Public high schools in California
1978 establishments in California